"Strangelove" is a song by English electronic music band Depeche Mode, released on 27 April 1987 as the lead single from their sixth studio album, Music for the Masses (1987). It reached number 16 on the UK Singles Chart, number two in West Germany and South Africa, and the top 10 in several other countries, including Ireland, Sweden and Switzerland. In the United States, it reached number 76 on the Billboard Hot 100 and was the first of nine number ones on the US Hot Dance Club Play chart, where it stayed for three weeks at the top.

The original single, though successful, did not seem to fit with Music for the Massess darker sound, so Daniel Miller remixed the track for subsequent inclusion on the album. Alan Wilder, in the Q&A section of his Recoil website, writes that the band felt the single version was "too cluttered" and was the reason Miller's remix was commissioned. Miller expounded on this in the Music for the Masses re-master documentary DVD, stating he felt the original single version was too complicated and would benefit from being simplified.

It was remixed by production team Bomb the Bass and released again as a single in the US, known informally as "Strangelove '88", this time reaching number 50 on the Hot 100.

B-sides
There are two B-sides for "Strangelove", both instrumental. "Pimpf" is a dark instrumental that is mostly piano, named after a magazine of the Hitler Youth organisations. "Pimpf" later shows up as the final track on Music for the Masses. There is also a remix available on some "Strangelove" single releases called "Fpmip" ("Pimpf" backwards).

The second instrumental is "Agent Orange", named after the herbicide used in the Vietnam War. The end of the song contains a repeated pattern in Morse code. "Agent Orange" was later included on the CD/Cassette version of Music for the Masses.

 There are 3 different durations for "Pimpf":

 "Pimpf" 3.56: This version appears on the original vinyl releases
 "Pimpf" 4.55: This version appears on vinyl & compact disc versions and contains a hidden track, Interlude #1, which starts at 4.18 (20 seconds after "Pimpf" has ended)
 "Pimpf" 4.34: This version appears on the "Strangelove" single release.

Music videos
The music video for "Strangelove" was directed by Anton Corbijn and appears on the Strange video and The Videos 86>98. Shot on Super 8 and monochrome, the video sees the band in various Paris locations, hotel rooms and in a studio posing in front of a rolling backdrop. The live action is combined with short stop-frame animation sequences.  The video also stars two models in underwear (one of whom was Anton Corbijn's partner), as well as passing pedestrians, featured in the closing 'out-takes' sequence of fast-edit shots.  In the USA, MTV objected to some of the more revealing footage of the models and the video was edited to replace them with images of the band.

There was also a Corbijn-directed video for "Pimpf", exclusive to the Strange video, which features Dave Gahan, Andy Fletcher and Alan Wilder shouting at each other and syncing with the synthetic chanting, while Martin Gore plays the song on a piano. While Gore plays the piano in the video, it is Wilder who plays the piano on all piano-instrumentals by the band from 1987–1990 as well as "Somebody".

In 1988, another video for "Strangelove" was released for the album version. It was directed by Martyn Atkins, who did photography for earlier DM albums. It was not publicly released on any videocassettes or DVDs until the Videos 86>98+ DVD in 2002. This video is much simpler than the original, and features the band performing inside a city-scape location (Senate House, the federal headquarters of the University of London).

Track listings
All tracks are written by Martin L. Gore.

UK 7-inch single (BONG 13)
US 7-inch single (7-28366)
 "Strangelove" – 3:45
 "Pimpf" – 4:33

UK 12-inch single (12 BONG 13)
 "Strangelove (Maxi Mix)" – 6:32
 "Strangelove (Midi Mix)" – 1:38
 "Fpmip" – 5:21

"Fpmip" is "Pimpf" with a different intro that sounds like the song played backwards.

UK limited-edition 12-inch single (L12 BONG 13)
 "Strangelove (Blind Mix)" – 6:31
 "Pimpf" – 4:33
 "Strangelove (Pain Mix)" – 7:19 (remixed by Phil Harding)
 "Agent Orange" – 5:05

UK promotional 12-inch single (DANCE BONG 13)
 "Strangelove (Blind Mix)" – 6:31
 "Strangelove (The Fresh Ground Mix)" – 8:14 (remixed by Phil Harding)

1991 UK CD single (CD BONG 13)
 "Strangelove (Maxi Mix)" – 6:32
 "Pimpf" – 4:33
 "Strangelove (Midi Mix)" – 1:38
 "Agent Orange" – 5:05
 "Strangelove" – 3:45

Originally released in card sleeve (1987) in two different versions (black-labeled and red-labeled disc)

1992 UK CD single (CD BONG 13)
 "Strangelove" – 3:45
 "Pimpf" – 4:33
 "Strangelove (Maxi Mix)" – 6:32
 "Agent Orange" – 5:05
 "Strangelove (Blind Mix)" – 6:31
 "Fpmip" – 5:21
 "Strangelove (Pain Mix)" – 7:19
 "Strangelove (Midi Mix)" – 1:38

US 12-inch single (0-20696)
 "Strangelove (Maxi Mix)" – 6:32
 "Strangelove (Midi Mix)" – 1:38
 "Strangelove (Blind Mix Edit)" – 6:10
 "Fpmip" – 5:21

US limited-edition 12-inch single (0-20769)
 "Strangelove" (Pain Mix) – 7:19
 "Strangelove" (Pain Mix 7" Edit) – 3:29
 "Agent Orange" – 5:05

US 3-inch CD single (2-27777)
 "Strangelove (Remix Edit)" – 3:52 (remixed by Tim Simenon & Mark Saunders)
 "Nothing (Remix Edit)" – 3:58 (remixed by Justin Strauss)

US 7-inch single (7-27777)
 "Strangelove" (Album Version 7" Edit) – 3:44
 "Nothing" (Remix Edit) – 3:58

Also released on cassette (27991-4)

US 12-inch single (0-21022)
 "Strangelove (Highjack Mix)" – 6:30 (remixed by Tim Simenon & Mark Saunders)
 "Strangelove (Remix Edit)" – 3:46
 "Nothing (Zip Hop Mix)" – 7:06 (remixed by Justin Strauss)
 "Nothing (Dub Mix)" – 6:40 (remixed by Justin Strauss)

US promotional CD single (PRO-CD-3213)
 "Strangelove" (Remix Edit) – 3:46
 "Strangelove" (Album Version 7" Edit) – 3:44
 "Strangelove" (Blind Mix 7" Edit) – 3:57
 "Strangelove" (Highjack Mix) – 6:30

The "Zip Hop Mix" of Nothing appeared on the rare fourth disc of Depeche Mode's remix compilation, Remixes 81-04 (2004).

Charts

Weekly charts

Year-end charts

See also
 List of number-one dance singles of 1987 (U.S.)

References

External links
 Single information from the official Depeche Mode web site
 AllMusic review

1987 singles
1987 songs
Black-and-white music videos
Depeche Mode songs
Music videos directed by Anton Corbijn
Mute Records singles
Songs written by Martin Gore